Rana Sherif Ahmed (born 20 July 1994) is an inactive Egyptian tennis player.

Sherif Ahmed On 8 November 2010, she reached her best singles ranking of world No. 1110. On 8 November 2010, she peaked at No. 982 in the doubles rankings.

Playing for the Egypt Fed Cup team, she has accumulated a win–loss record of 3–0.

ITF Circuit finals

Doubles (0–1)

Fed Cup participation

Doubles

References

External links
 
 
 

1994 births
Living people
Egyptian female tennis players
African Games medalists in tennis
African Games gold medalists for Egypt
Competitors at the 2019 African Games